Glyceryl octyl ascorbic acid (GO-VC) is an amphipathic derivative of vitamin C consisting of two ether linkages: a 1-octyl at position 2 and a glycerin at position 3. The chemical name is 2-glyceryl-3-octyl ascorbic acid. The isomer in which these two groups are swapped (2-octyl-3-glyceryl ascorbic acid, OG-VC) is also known.

It is considered as a new stable amphipathic  in the field of aesthetic medicine.

Overview 
Vitamin C is rapidly converted to ascorbic acid radicals by UV rays, which causes cytotoxicity and sunburn, but GO-VC improves the stability of conventional vitamin C derivatives, and thus eliminates the problems of these prooxidants.　Water-soluble vitamin C derivatives, such as sodium ascorbyl phosphate (APS), which have been used since the 1990s, have a problem of drying the skin in order to the sebum suppression effect. On the other hand, GO-VC has a high moisturizing power due to the binding of glycerin and can prevent the dryness of the skin.　In addition, GO-VC has a sterilizing activity of octanol, so it has a sterilizing activity against many bacteria.

GO-VC is also used for wound healing and wrinkle prevention because it has a proliferative effect on fibroblasts and a promoting effect on type I collagen production.  GO-VC has a stronger melanin production inhibitory effect than arbutin, which is used as a whitening agent, and it was confirmed in clinical trials that even low concentrations of 0.01 to 0.1% (by weight) are effective against acne redness and pigmentation.

The water-soluble vitamin C derivatives such as ascorbic acid 2-glucoside and APPS (trisodium ascorbyl palmitate) can not add to water-soluble polymer gels commonly used in cosmetics such as carboxy vinyl polymer and sodium polyacrylate. This is because the viscosity changes, causing precipitation. On the other hand, GO-VC can be dispersed in water-soluble polymer gel transparently and uniformly or can be stably dissolved for a long time.  

The fat-soluble vitamin C derivatives such as ascorbyl tetrahexyl decanoate (VC-IP) are almost insoluble in water, making it difficult to mix in water-soluble formulations such as lotions without the use of surfactants. Fat-soluble vitamin C derivatives causes lipid oxidation problems when lipids are released, and the color of the formulation tends to change.　GO-VC can solve these problems almost completely.

GO-VC is well absorbed percutaneously due to its amphiphilic nature, and because it is negatively charged rather than completely non-ionic, it can facilitate percutaneous absorption with an iontophoresis device. In addition, GO-VC is amphipathic but does not have a lipid group, so there are few skin toxicity problems due to lipid peroxidation, and it does not have the sticky feeling of conventional vitamin C derivatives and has a good feel.

Stability 
When the aqueous solution containing vitamin C and GO-VC was stored at 50 °C for 90 days, the vitamin C residual amount decreased to less than 30% in 30 days, whereas the residual amount of GO-VC was 90% or more. Moreover, after 90 days, 80% or more of GO-VC was confirmed to remain.

It is considered that these high stability are due to the two most reactive hydroxyl groups of vitamin C being capped by glycerin and octanol at the same time.  Because the viscosity is stable in the preparation containing GO-VC and the polymer gel too,  and it can be kept in a transparent state for a long period of time. Therefore, GO-VC can be added to many preparations such as lotions, creams, serums and gels.

Acne 
It was reported that GO-VC is effective against post-inflammatory hyperpigmentation (PIH), post-inflammatory erythema (PIE), and atrophic scar (AS), which are important complications in acne. It applied a complex vitamin C derivative lotion containing GO-VC to each of 10 patients with acne twice on the right side twice a day for 3 months, and confirmed the left side without application and its effect. It was reported that there was a marked improvement in PIH, PIE, and AS on the only right side applying lotion containing GO-VC after 3 months.

Pigmentation 
Many phenolic compounds, which are conventional whitening agents, react with tyrosinase to induce melanocyte-specific cytotoxicity, and thus there was a risk of developing vitiligo. GO-VC reduced the intracellular melanin content of B16 melanoma cells. GO-VC's pigmentation inhibitory mechanism is shown to act through a novel melanogenesis inhibitory system that does not depend on tyrosinase activity inhibition, indicating that it is a safe and effective pigmentation inhibitor with low risk of vitiligo. GO-VC showed a remarkable effect in an actual pigmentation suppression clinical study, and a gel preparation containing 0.1% GO-VC was applied twice a day in the morning and evening on the entire face after 13 female subjects aged 39.8 years on average. As a result of a 1-5 month study, GO-VC significantly improved post-inflammatory pigmentation. It is reported that GO-VC also showed a clear improvement in pigmentation caused by metal allergy, which was not very effective when applied with hydroquinone.

Skin pore related diseases 
Since conventional water-soluble vitamin C does not easily penetrate the skin barrier, an amphipathic vitamin C derivative was developed to improve this. However, since lipids such as palmitic acid were chemical modified to ViraminC derivatives in the past, exposure to ultraviolet light generated free fatty acids, raising concerns about lipid peroxidation. It was thought that GO-VC could avoid the problem of lipid peroxidation because GO-VC is amphipathic with octanol instead of lipid. The effect of 0.05% gel of GO-VC was investigated on skin pore related diseases. As a result, it was confirmed that there were no side effects and the number of abnormal pores decreased to 70% or less within 1 to 2 months after application.

References

Organic acids
3-Hydroxypropenals